Węgrów  is a town in eastern Poland with 12,561 inhabitants (31 December 2003). Situated in the Masovian Voivodeship (since 1999), it is the capital of Węgrów County.

History 

First mentioned in historical records in 1414, Węgrów received its city charter in 1441. Between 16th and 18th centuries it was an important centre for Reformation movements in Poland. It was a private town owned by various Polish nobles, including the Kiszka, Radziwiłł and Krasiński families, administratively located in the Podlaskie Voivodeship in the Lesser Poland Province of the Kingdom of Poland. The local Basilica of the Assumption houses the so-called Twardowski Mirror, a Renaissance mirror from the 16th century associated with the legend of Sir Twardowski.

After the Third Partition of Poland it was annexed by Austria in 1795. It was regained by Poles following the Austro–Polish War of 1809, and included within the short-lived Duchy of Warsaw. After the duchy's dissolution, in 1815, it passed to so-called Congress Poland in the Russian Partition of Poland. During the January Uprising, on February 3, 1863, it was the site of the Battle of Węgrów, in which Polish insurgents defeated Russian troops and captured the town. It became part of Poland again when the country regained its independence in 1918. During the Polish–Soviet War, on August 19, 1920, it was the site of a battle between Poles and the retreating Russian 16th Army.

Throughout most of its history, the town had a thriving Jewish community, present at least since the 16th century. It numbered about 6,000 in 1939. The entire community was exterminated during the Holocaust by the occupying forces of Nazi Germany. The town was liberated from German occupation by the Polish underground Home Army in August 1944 during the Operation Tempest.

People 
 Krzysztof Filipek
 Piotr z Goniądza
 Stanisław Kosior
 Pan Twardowski
 Danuta Wałęsa, former First Lady of Poland (1990-1995)

References

Further reading

External links
Official homepage of Węgrów 
 Jewish Community in Węgrów on Virtual Shtetl
Górczyk Wojciech Jerzy, BRIEF HISTORY OF THE CHURCH AND FORMER REFORMATI ORDER'S MONASTERY IN WĘGRÓW, Węgrów 2020.
Górczyk Wojciech Jerzy, The Former Reformati Order’s Monasteries Route, Węgrów 2020.

Cities and towns in Masovian Voivodeship
Węgrów County
Warsaw Voivodeship (1919–1939)
Shtetls
Holocaust locations in Poland